Paul Kim is an American classical pianist.

Kim began his musical training in southern California and continued his studies at The Juilliard School. At the Manhattan School of Music he received his undergraduate and graduate degrees, and went on to earn a Ph.D. from New York University. Among his teachers include Paul Jacobs, Gary Graffman, Solomon Mikowsky and Jerome Lowenthal.

Besides his solo performing career as a concert pianist, Kim has also received attention for his performances with his musical family. With his wife Judith Jeon, a soprano, Kim has performed widely in lieder recitals. In 1995, he and his son Matthew Kim made their debut as a father-and-son piano duo with a sold-out performance at Carnegie Hall. The duo has expanded with the addition of Kim's younger son, James. The trio of pianists, Paul Kim & Sons, has since performed throughout the world, often in benefit concerts for various social and charitable causes.

In addition to his performing career, Kim is president and co-founder of the Music Angels International Foundation. A profile of Kim's spiritual journey in music was featured in the book Creative Spirituality: The Way of the Artist written by Robert Wuthnow.

Kim is director of graduate music studies and professor of piano and music history at Long Island University LIU Post.

Specializations

Olivier Messiaen 
Kim is recognized as one of the leading specialists on the music of the French composer Olivier Messiaen. Among Kim's most notable achievements is his seven CD recording series comprising the complete piano works of Messiaen, released on the Centaur Records label from 2001 to 2005. Included in the series are Messiaen's major compositions such as Catalogue d'oiseaux, Vingt regards sur l'enfant-Jésus, and the two-piano work Visions de l'Amen recorded with his son, Matthew Kim, who was 15 years old at that time.

Critics have noted Kim's interpretations with references to his scholarly perspectives, athletic and poetic pianism, and spiritual qualities. The pianist Yvonne Loriod, the late composer's wife and the foremost interpreter of his music, described Kim's performances as "perfect in every way — technique, rhythm, color, sonority, emotion."

Beethoven 
Kim is currently in the midst of a multi-volume recording series of the complete cycle of Beethoven's Nine Symphonies in his original transcriptions for the piano. The first volume, the Ninth Symphony (in an arrangement for two pianos), was recorded with his son Matthew and released in 2008 by Centaur Records.

Victim of Fraud 

In 2007, it was revealed that Kim was among the classical pianists victimized by the recording scandal of Joyce Hatto. It was discovered that Hatto's recording of Messiaen's Vingt regards sur l'Enfant-Jésus was in fact Kim's recording of the same released by Centaur Records in 2002. A 2009 documentary film produced by Susannah Price in the UK entitled The Great Piano Scam investigated the fraud scheme and its impact on the world of classical music and the artists who were victimized.

Discography

Messiaen: Complete Works for Piano 
Centaur Records
Vol. 1: Birdsong Compositions: Catalogue d'oiseaux, La Fauvette des jardins, and Petites esquisses d'oiseaux (2001), 3 CDs
Vol. 2: Vingt Regards sur l’Enfant-Jésus (2002), 2 CDs
Vol. 3: Visions de l’Amen, Quatre Études de rythme, and Cantéyodjayâ (2003)
Vol. 4: The Early Works: Huit Préludes, Les offrandes oubliées, Fantaisie burlesque, Pièce pour le tombeau de Paul Dukas, Rondeau, Prélude (1964) pour Piano  (2005)

Beethoven: Complete Symphonies Transcribed for Solo Piano by Paul Kim 
Centaur Records
Vol. 1: Symphony No. 9 (2008)
Vol. 2: Symphonies Nos. 1 and 2 (2010)
Vol. 3: Symphony No. 3 and 15 Variations with Fugue (2013)
Vol. 4: Symphonies Nos. 4 and 5 (2017)
Vol. 5: Symphony No. 6 and Piano Sonata No. 15 (2020)
Vol. 6: Symphonies Nos. 7 and 8 (2020)

Other Recordings 
Stravinsky: Firebird and Petrouchka Suites, New York Philharmonic (LP, live recording 1978)

References 

Living people
Contemporary classical music performers
American classical pianists
American male classical pianists
Classical piano duos
New York University alumni
21st-century classical pianists
21st-century American male musicians
21st-century American pianists
Year of birth missing (living people)